The Screen Actors Guild Award for Outstanding Performance by a Female Actor in a Leading Role in a Motion Picture is an award given by the Screen Actors Guild to honor the finest acting achievements in film.

Winners and nominees

Legend:

1990s

2000s

2010s

2020s

Superlatives

Multiple winners
2 wins
 Viola Davis (The Help (2011), Ma Rainey's Black Bottom (2020))
 Frances McDormand (Fargo (1996), Three Billboards Outside Ebbing, Missouri (2017))
 Renée Zellweger (Chicago (2002), Judy (2019))

Multiple nominees
Note: Winners are indicated in bold type.

Two nominations
 Amy Adams (Arrival (2016), Hillbilly Elegy (2020))
 Joan Allen (Nixon (1995), The Contender (2000))
 Emily Blunt (The Girl On The Train (2016), Mary Poppins Returns (2018))
 Sandra Bullock (The Blind Side (2009), Gravity (2013))
 Jessica Chastain (Zero Dark Thirty (2012), The Eyes of Tammy Faye (2021))
 Glenn Close (Albert Nobbs (2011), The Wife (2018))
 Olivia Colman (The Favourite (2018), The Lost Daughter (2021))
 Marion Cotillard (La Vie en Rose (2007), Rust and Bone (2012))
 Lady Gaga (A Star is Born (2018), House of Gucci (2021))
 Angelina Jolie (A Mighty Heart (2007), Changeling (2008))
 Diane Keaton (Marvin's Room (1996), Something's Gotta Give (2003))
 Jennifer Lawrence (Winter's Bone (2010), Silver Linings Playbook (2012))
 Carey Mulligan (An Education (2009), Promising Young Woman (2020))
 Natalie Portman (Black Swan (2010), Jackie (2016))
 Saoirse Ronan (Brooklyn (2015), Lady Bird (2017))
 Susan Sarandon (The Client (1994), Dead Man Walking (1995))
 Emma Thompson (Sense and Sensibility (1995), Saving Mr. Banks (2013))
 Naomi Watts (21 Grams (2003), The Impossible (2012))
 Reese Witherspoon (Walk the Line (2005), Wild (2014))

Three nominations
 Annette Bening (American Beauty (1999), Being Julia (2004), The Kids Are All Right (2010))
 Viola Davis (The Help (2011), Ma Rainey's Black Bottom (2020), The Woman King (2022))
 Nicole Kidman (The Hours (2002), Rabbit Hole  (2010), Being the Ricardos  (2021))
 Frances McDormand (Fargo (1996), Three Billboards Outside Ebbing, Missouri (2017), Nomadland (2020))
 Julianne Moore (The End of the Affair (1999), Far from Heaven (2002), Still Alice (2014))
 Hilary Swank (Boys Don't Cry (1999), Million Dollar Baby (2004), Conviction (2010))
 Charlize Theron (Monster (2003), North Country (2005), Bombshell (2019))
 Renée Zellweger (Bridget Jones's Diary (2001), Chicago (2002), Judy (2019))

Four nominations
 Helen Mirren (The Queen (2006), The Last Station (2009), Hitchcock (2012), Woman in Gold (2015))
 Kate Winslet (Titanic (1997), Eternal Sunshine of the Spotless Mind (2004), Little Children  (2006), Revolutionary Road (2008))

Five nominations
 Cate Blanchett (Elizabeth (1998), Elizabeth: The Golden Age (2007), Blue Jasmine (2013), Carol (2015), Tár (2022))

Six nominations
 Judi Dench (Mrs Brown (1997), Iris (2001), Mrs Henderson Presents (2005), Notes on a Scandal (2006), Philomena (2013), Victoria & Abdul (2017))

Ten nominations
 Meryl Streep (The River Wild (1994), The Bridges of Madison County (1995), One True Thing  (1998), Music of the Heart (1999), The Devil Wears Prada (2006), Doubt (2008), Julie & Julia (2009), The Iron Lady (2011), August: Osage County (2013), Florence Foster Jenkins (2016))

See also
 Academy Award for Best Actress
 BAFTA Award for Best Actress in a Leading Role
 Critics' Choice Movie Award for Best Actress
 Independent Spirit Award for Best Female Lead
 Golden Globe Award for Best Actress in a Motion Picture – Drama
 Golden Globe Award for Best Actress – Motion Picture Comedy or Musical

External links 
 SAG Awards official site

Female Actor Leading Role
 
Film awards for lead actress